Guillaume Morissette (born 1983) is a Canadian fiction writer and poet based in Montreal, Quebec. His work has frequently been associated with the Alt Lit movement, with Dazed & Confused magazine describing him as "Canada's Alt Lit poster boy." He has published stories, poems and essays online and in print, in venues such as Maisonneuve, Little Brother, Broken Pencil, Shabby Doll House and Thought Catalog, and was listed as one of CBC Books' "Writers to Watch" for 2014.

His first novel, New Tab, was published in 2014 by Véhicule Press. New Tab was shortlisted by the Quebec Writers' Federation for the 2014 Paragraphe Hugh MacLennan Prize for Fiction, and for the 2015 amazon.ca First Novel Award.

Morissette is also the author of the collection of stories and poems I Am My Own Betrayal, which was published in 2012 by Maison Kasini.

New Tab

New Tab is a novel by Canadian author Guillaume Morissette. It was released in 2014, published by Véhicule Press. A French translation, Nouvel Onglet, was published by Éditions du Boréal in 2016.

New Tab was shortlisted by the Quebec Writers' Federation for the 2014 Paragraphe Hugh MacLennan Prize for Fiction, and for the 2015 amazon.ca First Novel Award.

Plot
New Tab follows a year in the life of Thomas, a twenty-six year old French Canadian video game designer who starts living with Anglophone roommates in Montreal's Mile-End district.

References

External links
 Author's page

21st-century Canadian novelists
Canadian male novelists
Alternative literature
Writers from Montreal
21st-century Canadian poets
Canadian male short story writers
1984 births
Living people
Canadian male poets
21st-century Canadian short story writers
21st-century Canadian male writers